Azhdahak may refer to:

 Azhdahak (mythology), an Armenian mythological being known as a man-dragon
 Azhdahak (volcano), a volcano in Armenia